David Adams and Andrei Olhovskiy were the defending champions, but none competed this year. Adams chose to compete at Los Angeles during the same week.

Francisco Montana and Greg Van Emburgh won the title by defeating Jordi Arrese and Wayne Arthurs 6–7, 6–3, 7–6 in the final.

Seeds
All seeds receive a bye into the second round.

Draw

Finals

Top half

Bottom half

References

External links
 Official results archive (ATP)
 Official results archive (ITF)

Doubles
Austrian Open Kitzbühel